The New Taipei City Hakka Museum is a museum about the Hakka people in Sanxia District, New Taipei, Taiwan.

History
The museum was originally established as Taipei County Hakka Museum, but it was later renamed as New Taipei City Hakka Museum.

Architecture
The museum total area spans over 4.03 hectares. The museum consists of the following sections: permanent exhibition hall, floor 2 long corridor, performance hall, special exhibition hall, briefing room, Hakka fashion exhibition, conference hall, restaurants and specialty shops, Hakka TV area, family reading room and boardwalk.

Transportation
The museum is accessible within walking distance south from Yingge Station of the Taiwan Railways.

See also
 List of museums in Taiwan

References

External links

 

Hakka museums in Taiwan
Museums in New Taipei
Museums with year of establishment missing